Vladika or Wladika is a Slavic title and address of bishops in the Eastern Orthodox Church. In Old Church Slavonic, the meaning of the word is Mr.

From the early-16th to the mid-19th century in Montenegro, the title referred to the bishop of Cetinje, who also served as the spiritual leader and the prince of the Prince-Bishopric of Montenegro.

References

See also
 List of Metropolitans of Montenegro
 

Eastern Christian ecclesiastical offices
Eastern Orthodox bishops
Metropolitans of Montenegro